Hayden Building may refer to:

 Hayden Building (Boston)
 Hayden Building (Columbus, Ohio)